Mario Massa (29 May 1892 – 16 February 1956) was an Italian freestyle swimmer who competed in the 1908 Summer Olympics, in the 1912 Summer Olympics, and in the 1920 Summer Olympics. He was born in Nervi. In 1908 he was eliminated in the first round of the 400 metre freestyle event. Four years later he was eliminated in the semi-finals of the 100 metre freestyle competition. He also participated in the 400 metre freestyle event and in the 1500 metre freestyle competition but in both he was eliminated in the first round. At the 1920 Games he was a member of the Italian relay team which finished fifth in the 4 x 200 metre freestyle relay competition. In the 100 metre freestyle event he was eliminated in the first round.

References

External links
 

1892 births
1956 deaths
Italian male swimmers
Olympic swimmers of Italy
Swimmers at the 1908 Summer Olympics
Swimmers at the 1912 Summer Olympics
Swimmers at the 1920 Summer Olympics
Italian male freestyle swimmers
People from Nervi